Jon Breakingbury (born 5 October 1982) is a professional rugby league and rugby union footballer.

International honours
Jon Breakingbury won a cap for Wales (RL) while at Valley Cougars in 2005 (interchange/substitute).

Note
Breakingbury's forename is variously spelt as Jon, or John.

References

External links
Lennon answers distant Wales call
Crusaders share spoils on début
(archived by web.archive.org) Cymru RL
(archived by web.archive.org) Cardiff Demons Rugby League Football Club

1982 births
Living people
Cardiff Demons players
Crusaders Rugby League players
Footballers who switched code
Place of birth missing (living people)
Rugby league centres
Sheffield Eagles players
Wales national rugby league team players
Welsh rugby league players
Welsh rugby union players